NZR A class may refer to:

 NZR A class (1873); 14 tank locomotives
 NZR A class (1906); 57 tender locomotives